The First Christian Church is a historic church at 120 East Walnut Street in Paris, Arkansas.  It is a T-shaped single-story building, constructed out of stone and concrete between 1930 and 1936 for a congregation of the Disciples of Christ organized about 1890.  It is the congregation's second church, the first having been severely damaged by a storm in 1929.  It is locally distinctive for its architecture, a basically Collegiate Gothic form with Romanesque details.

The building was listed on the National Register of Historic Places in 1995.

See also
National Register of Historic Places listings in Logan County, Arkansas

References

Churches on the National Register of Historic Places in Arkansas
Romanesque Revival church buildings in Arkansas
Gothic Revival church buildings in Arkansas
Churches completed in 1930
Buildings and structures in Paris, Arkansas
National Register of Historic Places in Logan County, Arkansas